Robert Pinget (Geneva, July 19, 1919 – August 25, 1997, Tours) was an avant-garde French writer, born in Switzerland, who wrote several novels and other prose pieces that drew comparison to Beckett and other major Modernist writers. He was also associated with the nouveau roman movement.

Recognition
In 1962, Germaine Tailleferre of Les Six set eleven of Pinget's poems in a song cycle entitled "Pancarte pour Une Porte D'Entrée" (roughly translated as "Handbill for an Entrance") for medium voice and piano, commissioned by the American Soprano and Arts Patron Alice Swanson Esty.

A translation of one of his best known works, The Inquisitory (1962), was republished by the Dalkey Archive Press in 2003.

Bibliography

Novels
Entre Fantoine et Agapa, Jarnac, Ed. Tour de Feu, 1951; Ed. de Minuit 1966 (tr. Between Fantoine and Agapa, 1982)
Mahu ou le matériau, Paris, Robert Laffont, 1952, Ed. de Minuit, 1956 (tr. Mahu or The Material, 1966, 2005)
Le Renard et la boussole, Paris, Gallimard, 1953; Ed. de Minuit, 1971
Graal flibuste, Paris, Ed. de Minuit, 1956 (tr. Graal Flibuste, 2015)
Baga, Paris, Ed. de Minuit, 1958 (tr. Baga, 1984)
Lettre morte, Paris, Ed. de Minuit, 1959
La Manivelle, Paris, Ed. de Minuit, 1960
Le Fiston, Paris, Ed. de Minuit, 1959 (tr. Monsieur Levert)
L'Inquisitoire, Paris, Ed. de Minuit, 1962 (tr. The Inquisitory, 1982, 2003)
Autour de Mortin, Paris, Ed. de Minuit, 1965
Quelqu'un, Paris, Ed. de Minuit, 1965 (tr. Someone, 1984)
Le Libera, Paris, Ed. de Minuit, 1968 (tr. The Libera Me Domine, 1978)
Passacaille, Paris, Ed. de Minuit, 1969 (tr. Passacaglia, 1978)
Fable, Paris, Ed. de Minuit, 1971 (tr. Fable, 1980)
Cette Voix, Paris, Ed. de Minuit, 1975 (tr. That Voice, 1982)
L'Apocryphe, Paris, Ed. de Minuit, 1980 (tr. The Apocrypha, 1986)
Monsieur Songe, Paris, Ed. de Minuit, 1982 (tr. Monsieur Songe, 1988)
Le Harnais, Paris, Ed. de Minuit, 1984
Charrue, Paris, Ed. de Minuit, 1985
L'Ennemi, Paris, Ed. de Minuit, 1987 (tr. The Enemy, 1991)Du Nerf, Paris, Ed. de Minuit, 1990 (tr. Be Brave, 1994)Cette Chose, by Robert Pinget and Jean Deyrolle (editor), Paris, (1967), 1990Théo ou le temps neuf, Paris, Ed. de Minuit, 1991 (tr. Theo or The New Era, 1994)L'Affaire Ducreux et autres textes, Paris, Ed. de Minuit, 1995Tâches d'encre, Paris, Ed. de Minuit, 1997 (tr. Traces of Ink, 2000)Mahu reparle, Paris, Ed. des Cendres, 2009La Fissure, précédée de Malicotte-la-Frontière, Genève, Ed. MetisPresses, 2009Jean Loiseau, in Histoires littéraires n° 40, 2010

PlaysClope au dossier, Paris, Ed. de Minuit, 1961Ici ou ailleurs, Paris, Ed. de Minuit, 1961Architruc, Paris, Ed. de Minuit, 1961L'Hypothèse, Paris, Ed. de Minuit, 1961Identité, Paris, Ed. de Minuit, 1971Abel et Bela, Ed. de Minuit, 1971, (Acte Sud, coll. "Répliques", 1992) (tr. Abel and Bela, 1987)Paralchimie, Paris, Ed. de Minuit, 1973Nuit, Paris, Ed. de Minuit, 1973Un Testament bizarre, Paris, Ed. de Minuit, 1986 (tr. A Bizarre Will, 1989)

 References 
 Jean-Louis de Rambures, "Comment travaillent les écrivains", Paris 1978 (interview with R. Pinget, in French)

Criticism in EnglishRobert Pinget: The Novel as Quest'', by Robert Henkels, 1977

External links 
 
The official website of Robert Pinget

Biography, in French
A comprehensive web site in French

1919 births
1997 deaths
Scientists from Geneva
Prix Femina winners
20th-century French novelists
French male novelists
20th-century French male writers
Swiss emigrants to France